Chengalpattu is a defunct Lok Sabha constituency in Tamil Nadu. It was earlier known as Chingleput. This constituency no longer exists, since it was defunct after 2009, due to delimitation. The region covered by this constituency are now a part of the Kancheepuram (Lok Sabha constituency).

Assembly segments
Chengalpattu Lok Sabha constituency was composed of the following assembly segments:
Tirupporur (SC) (moved to Kancheepuram constituency after 2009)
Chengalpattu (moved to Kancheepuram constituency after 2009)
Maduranthakam (moved to Kancheepuram constituency after 2009)
Acharapakkam (SC) (defunct) 
Uthiramerur (moved to Kancheepuram constituency after 2009)
Kancheepuram (moved to Kancheepuram constituency after 2009)

Members of Parliament

Defunct after 2009 changed to Kanchipuram loksabha constituency.

Election results

General Election 2004

General Election 1999

General Election 1998

General Election 1996

General Election 1991

General Election 1989

General Election 1984

General Election 1980

General Election 1977

General Election 1971

General Election 1967

General Election 1962

General Election 1957

General Election 1952

References

 Election Commission of India: https://web.archive.org/web/20081218010942/http://www.eci.gov.in/StatisticalReports/ElectionStatistics.asp

See also
 Chingleput, also known as Chengalpattu
 List of Constituencies of the Lok Sabha

Former Lok Sabha constituencies of Tamil Nadu
Former constituencies of the Lok Sabha
2008 disestablishments in India
Constituencies disestablished in 2008